Singe is an administrative ward in the Babati Urban District of the Manyara Region of Tanzania. According to the 2012 census, the ward has a population of 6,620.

References

Wards of Manyara Region
Babati District